Vitamin C (also known as ascorbic acid and ascorbate) is a water-soluble vitamin found in citrus and other fruits and vegetables, also sold as a dietary supplement and as a topical "serum" ingredient to treat melasma (dark pigment spots) and wrinkles on the face. It is used to prevent and treat scurvy. Vitamin C is an essential nutrient involved in the repair of tissue, the formation of collagen, and the enzymatic production of certain neurotransmitters. It is required for the functioning of several enzymes and is important for immune system function. It also functions as an antioxidant. Most animals are able to synthesize their own vitamin C. However, apes (including humans) and monkeys (but not all primates), most bats, some rodents, and certain other animals must acquire it from dietary sources.

There is some evidence that regular use of supplements may reduce the duration of the common cold, but it does not appear to prevent infection. It is unclear whether supplementation affects the risk of cancer, cardiovascular disease, or dementia. It may be taken by mouth or by injection.

Vitamin C is generally well tolerated. Large doses may cause gastrointestinal discomfort, headache, trouble sleeping, and flushing of the skin. Normal doses are safe during pregnancy. The United States Institute of Medicine recommends against taking large doses.

Vitamin C was discovered in 1912, isolated in 1928, and in 1933, the first vitamin to be chemically produced. It is on the World Health Organization's List of Essential Medicines. Vitamin C is available as an inexpensive generic and over-the-counter medication. Partly for its discovery, Albert Szent-Györgyi and Walter Norman Haworth were awarded the 1937 Nobel Prizes in Physiology and Medicine and Chemistry, respectively. Foods containing vitamin C include citrus fruits, kiwifruit, guava, broccoli, Brussels sprouts, bell peppers, potatoes, and strawberries. Prolonged storage or cooking may reduce vitaminC content in foods.

Definition
Vitamin C is an essential nutrient for certain animals including humans. The term vitamin C encompasses several vitamers that have vitamin C activity in animals. Ascorbate salts such as sodium ascorbate and calcium ascorbate are used in some dietary supplements. These release ascorbate upon digestion. Ascorbate and ascorbic acid are both naturally present in the body, since the forms interconvert according to pH. Oxidized forms of the molecule such as dehydroascorbic acid are converted back to ascorbic acid by reducing agents.

Vitamin C functions as a cofactor in many enzymatic reactions in animals (including humans) that mediate a variety of essential biological functions, including wound healing and collagen synthesis. In humans, vitamin C deficiency leads to impaired collagen synthesis, contributing to the more severe symptoms of scurvy. Another biochemical role of vitamin C is to act as an antioxidant (a reducing agent) by donating electrons to various enzymatic and non-enzymatic reactions. Doing so converts vitamin C to an oxidized state - either as semidehydroascorbic acid or dehydroascorbic acid. These compounds can be restored to a reduced state by glutathione and NADPH-dependent enzymatic mechanisms.

In plants, vitamin C is a substrate for ascorbate peroxidase. This enzyme utilizes ascorbate to neutralize excess hydrogen peroxide (H2O2) by converting it to water (H2O) and oxygen.

Deficiency

For those 20 years of age or above, data from the U.S. 2003-04 NHANES survey showed mean and median serum concentrations of 49.0 and 54.4μmol/L, respectively. The percent of people reported as deficient was 7.1%.

Scurvy is a disease resulting from a deficiency of vitamin C. Without this vitamin, collagen made by the body is too unstable to perform its function and several other enzymes in the body do not operate correctly. Scurvy is characterized by spots on and bleeding under the skin, spongy gums, 'corkscrew' hair growth, and poor wound healing. The skin lesions are most abundant on the thighs and legs, and a person with the ailment looks pale, feels depressed, and is partially immobilized. In advanced scurvy there are open, suppurating wounds, loss of teeth, bone abnormalities and, eventually, death.

Notable human dietary studies of experimentally induced scurvy were conducted on conscientious objectors during World War II in Britain and on Iowa state prisoners in the late 1960s to the 1980s. Men in the prison study developed the first signs of scurvy about four weeks after starting the vitamin C-free diet, whereas in the earlier British study, six to eight months were required, possibly due to the pre-loading of this group with a 70 mg/day supplement for six weeks before the scorbutic diet was fed. Men in both studies had blood levels of ascorbic acid too low to be accurately measured by the time they developed signs of scurvy. These studies both reported that all obvious symptoms of scurvy could be completely reversed by supplementation of only 10 mg a day.

People in sepsis or septic shock may have micronutrient deficiencies, including low levels of vitamin C.

Medical uses

Vitamin C has a definitive role in treating scurvy, which is a disease caused by vitaminC deficiency. Beyond that, a role for vitaminC as prevention or treatment for various diseases is disputed, with reviews reporting conflicting results. A 2012 Cochrane review reported no effect of vitaminC supplementation on overall mortality. It is on the World Health Organization's List of Essential Medicines.

Scurvy
The disease scurvy is caused by vitaminC deficiency and can be prevented and treated with vitaminC-containing foods or dietary supplements. It takes at least a month of little to no vitaminC before symptoms occur. Early symptoms are malaise and lethargy, progressing to shortness of breath, bone pain, bleeding gums, susceptibility to bruising, poor wound healing, and finally fever, convulsions and eventual death. Until quite late in the disease the damage is reversible, as healthy collagen replaces the defective collagen with vitaminC repletion. Treatment can be oral supplementation of the vitamin or by intramuscular or intravenous injection. Scurvy was known to Hippocrates in the classical era. The disease was shown to be prevented by citrus fruits in an early controlled trial by a Royal Navy surgeon, James Lind, in 1747, on board HMS Salisbury. From 1796 onward, lemon juice was issued to all Royal Navy crewmen.

Common cold

Research on vitaminC in the common cold has been divided into effects on prevention, duration, and severity. A Cochrane review which looked at at least 200 mg/day concluded that vitaminC taken on a regular basis was not effective in prevention of the common cold. Restricting analysis to trials that used at least 1000 mg/day also saw no prevention benefit. However, taking vitaminC on a regular basis did reduce the average duration by 8% in adults and 14% in children, and also reduced severity of colds. A subset of trials in adults reported that supplementation reduced the incidence of colds by half in marathon runners, skiers, or soldiers in subarctic conditions. Another subset of trials looked at therapeutic use, meaning that vitaminC was not started unless the people started to feel the beginnings of a cold. In these, vitaminC did not affect duration or severity. An earlier review stated that vitaminC did not prevent colds, did reduce duration, did not reduce severity. The authors of the Cochrane review concluded that:

Vitamin C distributes readily in high concentrations into immune cells, has antimicrobial and natural killer cell activities, promotes lymphocyte proliferation, and is consumed quickly during infections, effects suggesting a prominent role in immune system regulation. The European Food Safety Authority found a cause and effect relationship exists between the dietary intake of vitamin C and functioning of a normal immune system in adults and in children under three years of age.

Several studies found Vitamin C to have specific antiviral effects in which it inactivates the RNA or DNA of viruses or in the assembly of the virus.

COVID-19

According to ClinicalTrials.gov, as of early 2021 there were 50 completed or ongoing COVID-19 clinical trials including vitamin C as a treatment. A meta-analysis of six published trials was published in October 2021. Treatments were either oral or intravenous. Dose ranged from 50 mg/kg/day to 24 g/day. Reported outcomes were mortality, hospitalization duration, intensive care duration and need for ventilation. From the Conclusion: "The present meta-analysis showed that administration of vitamin C did not have any effect on major health outcomes in COVID infected patients, in comparison to either placebo/standard therapy. Sub-group analysis also revealed that irrespective of its dosage, route of administration and disease severity, it didn't have discernible benefit in such patients. Hence, larger prospective randomized trials are needed in order to evaluate the effect of isolated vitamin C administration, separately for both vitamin C replete and deplete individuals."

During March through July 2020, vitamin C was the subject of more US FDA warning letters than any other ingredient for prevention and/or treatment of COVID-19.

As of April 2021, the National Institutes of Health (NIH) COVID-19 Treatment Guidelines stated that "there are insufficient data to recommend either for or against the use of vitaminC for the prevention or treatment of COVID-19."

Cancer
There is no evidence that vitamin C supplementation reduces the risk of lung cancer in healthy people or those at high risk due to smoking or asbestos exposure. A second meta-analysis found no effect on the risk of prostate cancer. Two meta-analyses evaluated the effect of vitamin C supplementation on the risk of colorectal cancer. One found a weak association between vitamin C consumption and reduced risk, and the other found no effect from supplementation. A 2011 meta-analysis failed to find support for the prevention of breast cancer with vitamin C supplementation, but a second study concluded that vitamin C may be associated with increased survival in those already diagnosed. A 2015 meta-analysis showed no antitumor effect nor improvement in quality-of-life measures from high-dose vitamin C. This review included trials of oral and intravenous vitamin C.

Cardiovascular disease
In 2017, an independent study evaluating 15,445 participants found no evidence to show vitamin C decreases the risk cardiovascular disease. These results supported one 2013 review which found no evidence that antioxidant vitamin supplementation reduces the risk of myocardial infarction, stroke, cardiovascular mortality, or all-cause mortality (it did not provide subset analysis for trials that just used vitamin C).

However, another 2013 review found an association between higher circulating vitamin C levels or dietary vitamin C and a lower risk of stroke.

A 2014 review found a positive effect of vitamin C on endothelial dysfunction when taken at doses greater than 500 mg per day. The endothelium is a layer of cells that line the interior surface of blood vessels.

Brain function
A 2017 systematic review found lower vitamin C concentrations in people with cognitive impairment, including Alzheimer's disease and dementia, compared to people with normal cognition. The cognitive testing, however, relied on the Mini-Mental State Examination, which is only a general test of cognition, indicating an overall low quality of research assessing the potential importance of vitamin C on cognition in normal and impaired people. A review of nutrient status in people with Alzheimer's disease reported low plasma vitamin C, but also low blood levels of folate, vitamin B12, and vitamin E.

Iron deficiency 
One of the causes of iron-deficiency anemia is reduced absorption of iron. Iron absorption can be enhanced though ingestion of vitamin C alongside iron-containing food or supplements. The instability of vitamin C during cooking and/or storage limits the number of foods suitable for this. Vitamin C helps to keep iron in the reduced ferrous state, which is more soluble and more easily absorbed.

Other diseases
Studies examining the effects of vitamin C intake on the risk of Alzheimer's disease have reached conflicting conclusions. Maintaining a healthy dietary intake is probably more important than supplementation for achieving any potential benefit. A 2010 review found no role for vitamin C supplementation in the treatment of rheumatoid arthritis. Vitamin C supplementation does not prevent or slow the progression of age-related cataract. A systematic review reported that low intake and low serum concentration was associated with greater progression of periodontal disease. Vitamin C is marketed as a topical "serum" ingredient to prevent or treat skin aging, melasma (dark pigment spots) and wrinkles on the face. The purported mechanism is that if functions as an antioxidant, neutralizing free radicals from sunlight exposure, air pollutants or normal metabolic processes.

Side effects
Vitamin C is a water-soluble vitamin, with dietary excesses not absorbed, and excesses in the blood rapidly excreted in the urine, so it exhibits remarkably low acute toxicity. More than two to three grams may cause indigestion, particularly when taken on an empty stomach. However, taking vitamin C in the form of sodium ascorbate and calcium ascorbate may minimize this effect. Other symptoms reported for large doses include nausea, abdominal cramps and diarrhea. These effects are attributed to the osmotic effect of unabsorbed vitamin C passing through the intestine. In theory, high vitamin C intake may cause excessive absorption of iron. A summary of reviews of supplementation in healthy subjects did not report this problem, but left as untested the possibility that individuals with hereditary hemochromatosis might be adversely affected.

There is a longstanding belief among the mainstream medical community that vitamin C increases risk of kidney stones. "Reports of kidney stone formation associated with excess ascorbic acid intake are limited to individuals with renal disease". Reviews state that "data from epidemiological studies do not support an association between excess ascorbic acid intake and kidney stone formation in apparently healthy individuals", although one large, multi-year trial did report a nearly two-fold increase in kidney stones in men who regularly consumed a vitamin C supplement.

Diet

Recommended levels
Recommendations for vitamin C intake by adults have been set by various national agencies:
40 milligrams per day: India National Institute of Nutrition, Hyderabad
45 milligrams per day or 300 milligrams per week: the World Health Organization
80 milligrams per day: the European Commission Council on nutrition labeling
90 mg/day (males) and 75 mg/day (females): Health Canada 2007
90 mg/day (males) and 75 mg/day (females): United States National Academy of Sciences.
100 milligrams per day: Japan National Institute of Health and Nutrition.
110 mg/day (males) and 95 mg/day (females): European Food Safety Authority

In 2000, the chapter on Vitamin C in the North American Dietary Reference Intake was updated to give the Recommended Dietary Allowance (RDA) as 90 milligrams per day for adult men, 75 mg/day for adult women, and setting a Tolerable upper intake level (UL) for adults of 2,000 mg/day. The table (right) shows RDAs for the United States and Canada for children, and for pregnant and lactating women, as well as the ULs for adults. 

For the European Union, the EFSA set higher recommendations for adults, and also for children: 20 mg/day for ages 1–3, 30 mg/day for ages 4–6, 45 mg/day for ages 7–10, 70 mg/day for ages 11–14, 100 mg/day for males ages 15–17, 90 mg/day for females ages 15–17. For pregnancy 100 mg/day; for lactation 155 mg/day. 

India, on the other hand, has set recommendations much lower: 40 mg/day for ages 1 through adult, 60 mg/day for pregnancy, and 80 mg/day for lactation. Clearly, there is not consensus among countries.

Cigarette smokers and people exposed to secondhand smoke have lower serum vitamin C levels than nonsmokers. The thinking is that inhalation of smoke causes oxidative damage, depleting this antioxidant vitamin. The U.S. Institute of Medicine estimated that smokers need 35 mg more vitamin C per day than nonsmokers, but did not formally establish a higher RDA for smokers. One meta-analysis showed an inverse relationship between vitamin C intake and lung cancer, although it concluded that more research is needed to confirm this observation.

The U.S. National Center for Health Statistics conducts biannual National Health and Nutrition Examination Survey (NHANES) to assess the health and nutritional status of adults and children in the United States. Some results are reported as What We Eat In America. The 2013-2014 survey reported that for adults ages 20 years and older, men consumed on average 83.3 mg/d and women 75.1 mg/d. This means that half the women and more than half the men are not consuming the RDA for vitamin C. The same survey stated that about 30% of adults reported they consumed a vitamin C dietary supplement or a multi-vitamin/mineral supplement that included vitamin C, and that for these people total consumption was between 300 and 400 mg/d.

Tolerable upper intake level
In 2000, the Institute of Medicine of the U.S. National Academy of Sciences set a Tolerable upper intake level (UL) for adults of 2,000 mg/day. The amount was chosen because human trials had reported diarrhea and other gastrointestinal disturbances at intakes of greater than 3,000 mg/day. This was the Lowest-Observed-Adverse-Effect Level (LOAEL), meaning that other adverse effects were observed at even higher intakes. ULs are progressively lower for younger and younger children. In 2006, the European Food Safety Authority (EFSA) also pointed out the disturbances at that dose level, but reached the conclusion that there was not sufficient evidence to set a UL for vitamin C, as did the Japan National Institute of Health and Nutrition in 2010.

Food labeling
For U.S. food and dietary supplement labeling purposes, the amount in a serving is expressed as a percent of Daily Value (%DV). For vitamin C labeling purposes, 100% of the Daily Value was 60 mg, but as of May 27, 2016, it was revised to 90 mg to bring it into agreement with the RDA. A table of the old and new adult daily values is provided at Reference Daily Intake.

European Union regulations require that labels declare energy, protein, fat, saturated fat, carbohydrates, sugars, and salt. Voluntary nutrients may be shown if present in significant amounts. Instead of Daily Values, amounts are shown as percent of Reference Intakes (RIs). For vitamin C, 100% RI was set at 80 mg in 2011.

Sources
Although also present in other foods, the richest natural sources of vitamin C are fruits and vegetables. The vitamin is the most widely taken dietary supplement.

Plant sources

While plant foods are generally a good source of vitamin C, the amount in foods of plant origin depends on the variety of the plant, soil condition, climate where it grew, length of time since it was picked, storage conditions, and method of preparation. Organically farmed citrus may have a higher vitamin C content than conventionally farmed. The following table is approximate and shows the relative abundance in different raw plant sources. Generally, cooking reduces the amount of vitamin C. As some plants were analyzed fresh while others were dried (thus, artificially increasing concentration of individual constituents such as vitamin C), the data are subject to potential variation and difficulties for comparison. The amount is given in milligrams per 100 grams of the edible portion of the fruit or vegetable:

Animal sources
Compared to plant sources, animal-sourced foods do not provide so great an amount of vitamin C, and what there is, is largely destroyed by the heat used when it is cooked. For example, raw chicken liver contains 17.9 mg/100 g, but fried, the content is reduced to 2.7 mg/100 g. Smoked products, such as beef sticks, retain some vitamin C however. 

Vitamin C is present in human breast milk at 5.0 mg/100 g. One tested sample of infant formula contained 6.1 mg/100 g. Cow's milk contains only 1.0 mg/ 100 g, but the heat of pasteurization destroys it. Goat's milk contains 1.3mg/100 g, unless pasteurized. 

Chicken eggs contain no vitamin C, whether raw or cooked.

Food preparation
Vitamin C chemically decomposes under certain conditions, many of which may occur during the cooking of food. Vitamin C concentrations in various food substances decrease with time in proportion to the temperature at which they are stored. Cooking can reduce the vitamin C content of vegetables by around 60%, possibly due to increased enzymatic destruction. Longer cooking times may add to this effect.

Another cause of vitaminC loss from food is leaching, which transfers vitaminC to the cooking water, which is decanted and not consumed. Broccoli may retain vitaminC during cooking or storage more than most vegetables.

Supplements
Vitamin C dietary supplements are available as tablets, capsules, drink mix packets, in multi-vitamin/mineral formulations, in antioxidant formulations, and as crystalline powder. Vitamin C is also added to some fruit juices and juice drinks. Tablet and capsule content ranges from 25 mg to 1500 mg per serving. The most commonly used supplement compounds are ascorbic acid, sodium ascorbate and calcium ascorbate. Vitamin C molecules can also be bound to the fatty acid palmitate, creating ascorbyl palmitate, or else incorporated into liposomes.

Food fortification
In 2014, the Canadian Food Inspection Agency evaluated the effect of fortification of foods with ascorbate in the guidance document, Foods to Which Vitamins, Mineral Nutrients and Amino Acids May or Must be Added. Voluntary and mandatory fortification was described for various classes of foods. Among foods classified for mandatory fortification with vitaminC were fruit-flavored drinks, mixes, and concentrates, foods for a low-energy diet, meal replacement products, and evaporated milk.

Food additives
Ascorbic acid and some of its salts and esters are common additives added to various foods, such as canned fruits, mostly to slow oxidation and enzymatic browning. It may be used as a flour treatment agent used in breadmaking. As food additives, they are assigned E numbers, with safety assessment and approval the responsibility of the European Food Safety Authority. The relevant E numbers are:
 E300 ascorbic acid (approved for use as a food additive in the UK, U.S. Canada, Australia and New Zealand)
 E301 sodium ascorbate (approved for use as a food additive in the UK, U.S., Canada, Australia and New Zealand)
 E302 calcium ascorbate (approved for use as a food additive in the UK, U.S. Canada, Australia and New Zealand)
 E303 potassium ascorbate (approved in Australia and New Zealand, but not in the UK, U.S. or Canada) 
 E304 fatty acid esters of ascorbic acid such as ascorbyl palmitate (approved for use as a food additive in the UK, U.S., Canada, Australia and New Zealand)

The stereoisomers of Vitamin C have a similar effect in food despite their lack of efficacy in humans. They include erythorbic acid and its sodium salt (E315, E316).

Pharmacology

Pharmacodynamics 

Vitamin C – specifically, in the form of ascorbate – performs numerous physiological functions in the human body by serving as an enzyme substrate or cofactor and an electron donor. These functions include the synthesis of collagen, carnitine, and neurotransmitters; the synthesis and catabolism of tyrosine; and the metabolism of microsomes. During biosynthesis, ascorbate acts as a reducing agent, donating electrons and preventing oxidation to keep iron and copper atoms in their reduced states.

Vitamin C functions as a cofactor for the following enzymes:

 Three groups of enzymes (prolyl-3-hydroxylases, prolyl-4-hydroxylases, and lysyl hydroxylases) that are required for the hydroxylation of proline and lysine in the synthesis of collagen. These reactions add hydroxyl groups to the amino acids proline or lysine in the collagen molecule via prolyl hydroxylase and lysyl hydroxylase, both requiring vitamin C as a cofactor. The role of vitamin C as a cofactor is to oxidize prolyl hydroxylase and lysyl hydroxylase from Fe to Fe and to reduce it from Fe to Fe. Hydroxylation allows the collagen molecule to assume its triple helix structure, and thus vitamin C is essential to the development and maintenance of scar tissue, blood vessels, and cartilage.
Two enzymes (ε-N-trimethyl-L-lysine hydroxylase and γ-butyrobetaine hydroxylase) are necessary for synthesis of carnitine. Carnitine is essential for the transport of fatty acids into mitochondria for ATP generation.
 Hypoxia-inducible factor-proline dioxygenase enzymes (isoforms: EGLN1, EGLN2, and EGLN3)
 Dopamine beta-hydroxylase participates in the biosynthesis of norepinephrine from dopamine.
 Peptidylglycine alpha-amidating monooxygenase amidates peptide hormones by removing the glyoxylate residue from their c-terminal glycine residues. This increases peptide hormone stability and activity.

Absorption, metabolism and excretion 
From the U.S. National Institutes of Health: [In humans] "Approximately 70%–90% of vitamin C is absorbed at moderate intakes of 30–180 mg/day. However, at doses above 1,000 mg/day, absorption falls to less than 50%." It is transported through the intestine via both glucose-sensitive and glucose-insensitive mechanisms, so the presence of large quantities of sugar in the intestine can slow absorption.

Ascorbic acid is absorbed in the body by both active transport and simple diffusion. Sodium-Dependent Active Transport—Sodium-Ascorbate Co-Transporters (SVCTs) and Hexose transporters (GLUTs)—are the two transporter proteins required for active absorption. SVCT1 and SVCT2 import the reduced form of ascorbate across plasma membranes. GLUT1 and GLUT3 are glucose transporters, and transfer only the dehydroascorbic acid (DHA) form of vitamin C. Although dehydroascorbic acid is absorbed in higher rate than ascorbate, the amount of dehydroascorbic acid found in plasma and tissues under normal conditions is low, as cells rapidly reduce dehydroascorbic acid to ascorbate.

SVCTs appear to be the predominant system for vitamin C transport in the body, the notable exception being red blood cells, which lose SVCT proteins during maturation. In both vitamin C synthesizers (example: rat) and non-synthesizers (example: human) cells with few exceptions maintain ascorbic acid concentrations much higher than the approximately 50 micromoles/liter (µmol/L) found in plasma. For example, the ascorbic acid content of pituitary and adrenal glands can exceed 2,000 µmol/L, and muscle is at 200-300 µmol/L. The known coenzymatic functions of ascorbic acid do not require such high concentrations, so there may be other, as yet unknown functions. A consequence of all this high concentration organ content is that plasma vitamin C is not a good indicator of whole-body status, and people may vary in the amount of time needed to show symptoms of deficiency when consuming a diet very low in vitamin C.

Excretion can be as ascorbic acid, via urine. In humans, during times of low dietary intake, vitamin C is reabsorbed by the kidneys rather than excreted. This salvage process delays onset of deficiency. Only when plasma concentrations are 1.4 mg/dL or higher does re-absorption decline and the excess amounts pass freely into the urine. Ascorbic acid also converts (reversibly) to dehydroascorbate (DHA) and from that compound non-reversibly to 2,3-diketogulonate and then oxalate. These three compounds are also excreted via urine. Humans are better than guinea pigs at converting DHA back to ascorbate, and thus take much longer to become vitamin C deficient.

Chemistry 

The name "vitamin C" always refers to the -enantiomer of ascorbic acid and its oxidized forms, such as dehydroascorbate (DHA). Therefore, unless written otherwise, "ascorbate" and "ascorbic acid" refer in the nutritional literature to -ascorbate and -ascorbic acid respectively. Ascorbic acid is a weak sugar acid structurally related to glucose. In biological systems, ascorbic acid can be found only at low pH, but in solutions above pH 5 is predominantly found in the ionized form, ascorbate. All of these molecules have vitamin C activity and thus are used synonymously with vitamin C, unless otherwise specified.

Numerous analytical methods have been developed for ascorbic acid detection. For example, vitamin C content of a food sample such as fruit juice can be calculated by measuring the volume of the sample required to decolorize a solution of dichlorophenolindophenol (DCPIP) and then calibrating the results by comparison with a known concentration of vitamin C.

Testing 
Simple tests are available to measure the levels of vitamin C in urine and serum. These better reflect recent dietary intake rather than total body content. It has been observed that while serum concentrations follow a circadian rhythm or reflect short-term dietary influence, content within cells or tissues is more stable and can give a better view of the availability of ascorbate within the entire organism. However, very few hospital laboratories are adequately equipped and trained to carry out such detailed analyses.

Synthesis
Most animals and plants are able to synthesize vitamin C through a sequence of enzyme-driven steps, which convert monosaccharides to vitamin C. Yeasts do not make -ascorbic acid but rather its stereoisomer, erythorbic acid. In plants, synthesis is accomplished through the conversion of mannose or galactose to ascorbic acid. In animals, the starting material is glucose. In some species that synthesize ascorbate in the liver (including mammals and perching birds), the glucose is extracted from glycogen; ascorbate synthesis is a glycogenolysis-dependent process. In humans and in animals that cannot synthesize vitamin C, the enzyme -gulonolactone oxidase (GULO), which catalyses the last step in the biosynthesis, is highly mutated and non-functional.

Animal synthesis 
There is some information on serum vitamin C concentrations maintained in animal species that are able to synthesize vitamin C. One study of several breeds of dogs reported an average of 35.9 μmol/L. A report on goats, sheep and cattle reported ranges of 100–110, 265-270 and 160-350 μmol/L, respectively.

The biosynthesis of ascorbic acid in vertebrates starts with the formation of UDP-glucuronic acid. UDP-glucuronic acid is formed when UDP-glucose undergoes two oxidations catalyzed by the enzyme UDP-glucose 6-dehydrogenase. UDP-glucose 6-dehydrogenase uses the co-factor NAD+ as the electron acceptor. The transferase UDP-glucuronate pyrophosphorylase removes a UMP and glucuronokinase, with the cofactor ADP, removes the final phosphate leading to -glucuronic acid. The aldehyde group of this compound is reduced to a primary alcohol using the enzyme glucuronate reductase and the cofactor NADPH, yielding -gulonic acid. This is followed by lactone formationutilizing the hydrolase gluconolactonasebetween the carbonyl on C1 and hydroxyl group on C4. -Gulonolactone then reacts with oxygen, catalyzed by the enzyme L-gulonolactone oxidase (which is nonfunctional in humans and other Haplorrhini primates; see Unitary pseudogenes) and the cofactor FAD+. This reaction produces 2-oxogulonolactone (2-keto-gulonolactone), which spontaneously undergoes enolization to form ascorbic acid.

Some mammals have lost the ability to synthesize vitamin C, including simians and tarsiers, which together make up one of two major primate suborders, Haplorrhini. This group includes humans. The other more primitive primates (Strepsirrhini) have the ability to make vitamin C. Synthesis does not occur in most bats nor in species in the rodent family Caviidae, which includes guinea pigs and capybaras, but does occur in other rodents, including rats and mice.

Reptiles and older orders of birds make ascorbic acid in their kidneys.  Recent orders of birds and most mammals make ascorbic acid in their liver. A number of species of passerine birds also do not synthesize, but not all of them, and those that do not are not clearly related; it has been proposed that the ability was lost separately a number of times in birds. In particular, the ability to synthesize vitamin C is presumed to have been lost and then later re-acquired in at least two cases. The ability to synthesize vitaminC has also been lost in about 96% of fish (the teleosts).

Most tested families of bats (order Chiroptera), including major insect and fruit-eating bat families, cannot synthesize vitamin C. A trace of gulonolactone oxidase was detected in only 1 of 34 bat species tested, across the range of 6 families of bats tested. There are at least two species of bats, frugivorous bat (Rousettus leschenaultii) and insectivorous bat (Hipposideros armiger), that retain (or regained) their ability of vitamin C production.

Some of these species (including humans) are able to make do with the lower amounts available from their diets by recycling oxidised vitamin C.

On a milligram consumed per kilogram of body weight basis, most simian species consume the vitamin in amounts 10 to 20 times higher than what is recommended by governments for humans. This discrepancy constitutes much of the basis of the controversy on current recommended dietary allowances. It is countered by arguments that humans are very good at conserving dietary vitamin C, and are able to maintain blood levels of vitamin C comparable with simians on a far smaller dietary intake, perhaps by recycling oxidized vitamin C.

Evolution of animal synthesis
Ascorbic acid is a common enzymatic cofactor in mammals used in the synthesis of collagen, as well as a powerful reducing agent capable of rapidly scavenging a number of reactive oxygen species (ROS). Given that ascorbate has these important functions, it is surprising that the ability to synthesize this molecule has not always been conserved. In fact, anthropoid primates, Cavia porcellus (guinea pigs), teleost fishes, most bats, and some passerine birds have all independently lost the ability to internally synthesize vitamin C in either the kidney or the liver. In all of the cases where genomic analysis was done on an ascorbic acid auxotroph, the origin of the change was found to be a result of loss-of-function mutations in the gene that encodes L-gulono-γ-lactone oxidase, the enzyme that catalyzes the last step of the ascorbic acid pathway outlined above. One explanation for the repeated loss of the ability to synthesize vitamin C is that it was the result of genetic drift; assuming that the diet was rich in vitaminC, natural selection would not act to preserve it.

In the case of the simians, it is thought that the loss of the ability to make vitamin C may have occurred much farther back in evolutionary history than the emergence of humans or even apes, since it evidently occurred soon after the appearance of the first primates, yet sometime after the split of early primates into the two major suborders Haplorrhini (which cannot make vitamin C) and its sister suborder of non-tarsier prosimians, the Strepsirrhini ("wet-nosed" primates), which retained the ability to make vitamin C. According to molecular clock dating, these two suborder primate branches parted ways about 63 to 60 million years ago. Approximately three to five million years later (58 million years ago), only a short time afterward from an evolutionary perspective, the infraorder Tarsiiformes, whose only remaining family is that of the tarsier (Tarsiidae), branched off from the other haplorrhines. Since tarsiers also cannot make vitamin C, this implies the mutation had already occurred, and thus must have occurred between these two marker points (63 to 58 million years ago).

It has also been noted that the loss of the ability to synthesize ascorbate strikingly parallels the inability to break down uric acid, also a characteristic of primates. Uric acid and ascorbate are both strong reducing agents. This has led to the suggestion that, in higher primates, uric acid has taken over some of the functions of ascorbate.

Plant synthesis 

There are many different biosynthesis pathways for ascorbic acid in plants. Most of these pathways are derived from products found in glycolysis and other pathways. For example, one pathway goes through the plant cell wall polymers. The plant ascorbic acid biosynthesis pathway most principal seems to be -galactose. -Galactose reacts with the enzyme  -galactose dehydrogenase, whereby the lactone ring opens and forms again but with lactone between the carbonyl on C1 and hydroxyl group on C4, resulting in -galactonolactone.  -Galactonolactone then reacts with the mitochondrial flavoenzyme -galactonolactone dehydrogenase. to produce ascorbic acid. -Ascorbic acid has a negative feedback on -galactose dehydrogenase in spinach.
Ascorbic acid efflux by embryo of dicots plants is a well-established mechanism of iron reduction, and a step obligatory for iron uptake.

All plants synthesize ascorbic acid. Ascorbic acid functions as a cofactor for enzymes involved in photosynthesis, synthesis of plant hormones, as an antioxidant and also regenerator of other antioxidants. Plants use multiple pathways to synthesize vitamin C. The major pathway starts with glucose, fructose or mannose (all simple sugars) and proceeds to L-galactose, L-galactonolactone and ascorbic acid. There is feedback regulation in place, in that the presence of ascorbic acid inhibits enzymes in the synthesis pathway. This process follows a diurnal rhythm, so that enzyme expression peaks in the morning to support biosynthesis later on when mid-day sunlight intensity demands high ascorbic acid concentrations. Minor pathways may be specific to certain parts of plants; these can be either identical to the vertebrate pathway (including the GLO enzyme), or start with inositol and get to ascorbic acid via L-galactonic acid to L-galactonolactone.

Industrial synthesis
Vitamin C is produced from glucose by two main routes. The Reichstein process, developed in the 1930s, uses a single pre-fermentation followed by a purely chemical route. The modern two-step fermentation process, originally developed in China in the 1960s, uses additional fermentation to replace part of the later chemical stages. The Reichstein process and the modern two-step fermentation processes use sorbitol as the starting material and convert it to sorbose using fermentation. The modern two-step fermentation process then converts sorbose to 2-keto-l-gulonic acid (KGA) through another fermentation step, avoiding an extra intermediate. 
Both processes yield approximately 60% vitamin C from the glucose feed.

In 2017, China produced about 95% of the world supply of ascorbic acid (vitamin C), which is China's most exported vitamin, having total revenue of US$880 million in 2017. Due to pressure on Chinese industry to discontinue burning coal normally used for vitamin C manufacturing, the price of vitamin C rose three-fold in 2016 alone to US$12 per kg.

History

Scurvy at sea

In the 1497 expedition of Vasco da Gama, the curative effects of citrus fruit were known. Later, the Portuguese planted fruit trees and vegetables in Saint Helena, a stopping point for homebound voyages from Asia, which sustained passing ships.

Authorities occasionally recommended plant food to prevent scurvy during long sea voyages. John Woodall, the first surgeon to the British East India Company, recommended the preventive and curative use of lemon juice in his 1617 book, The Surgeon's Mate. In 1734, the Dutch writer Johann Bachstrom gave the firm opinion, "scurvy is solely owing to a total abstinence from fresh vegetable food, and greens."

Scurvy had long been a principal killer of sailors during the long sea voyages. According to Jonathan Lamb, "In 1499, Vasco da Gama lost 116 of his crew of 170; In 1520, Magellan lost 208 out of 230;...all mainly to scurvy."

The first attempt to give scientific basis for the cause of this disease was by a ship's surgeon in the Royal Navy, James Lind. While at sea in May 1747, Lind provided some crew members with two oranges and one lemon per day, in addition to normal rations, while others continued on cider, vinegar, sulfuric acid or seawater, along with their normal rations, in one of the world's first controlled experiments. The results showed that citrus fruits prevented the disease. Lind published his work in 1753 in his Treatise on the Scurvy.

Fresh fruit was expensive to keep on board, whereas boiling it down to juice allowed easy storage but destroyed the vitamin (especially if boiled in copper kettles). It was 1796 before the British navy adopted lemon juice as standard issue at sea. In 1845, ships in the West Indies were provided with lime juice instead, and in 1860 lime juice was used throughout the Royal Navy, giving rise to the American use of the nickname "limey" for the British. Captain James Cook had previously demonstrated the advantages of carrying "Sour krout" on board, by taking his crews to the Hawaiian Islands without losing any of his men to scurvy. For this, the British Admiralty awarded him a medal.

The name antiscorbutic was used in the eighteenth and nineteenth centuries for foods known to prevent scurvy. These foods included lemons, limes, oranges, sauerkraut, cabbage, malt, and portable soup. In 1928, the Canadian Arctic anthropologist Vilhjalmur Stefansson showed that the Inuit avoid scurvy on a diet of largely raw meat. Later studies on traditional food diets of the Yukon First Nations, Dene, Inuit, and Métis of Northern Canada showed that their daily intake of vitamin C averaged between 52 and 62 mg/day, comparable with the Estimated Average Requirement.

Discovery 

Vitamin C was discovered in 1912, isolated in 1928 and synthesized in 1933, making it the first vitamin to be synthesized. Shortly thereafter Tadeus Reichstein succeeded in synthesizing the vitamin in bulk by what is now called the Reichstein process. This made possible the inexpensive mass-production of vitamin C. In 1934 Hoffmann–La Roche trademarked synthetic vitamin C under the brand name Redoxon and began to market it as a dietary supplement.

In 1907 a laboratory animal model which would help to identify the antiscorbutic factor was discovered by the Norwegian physicians Axel Holst and Theodor Frølich, who when studying shipboard beriberi, fed guinea pigs their test diet of grains and flour and were surprised when scurvy resulted instead of beriberi. By luck, this species did not make its own vitamin C, whereas mice and rats do. In 1912, the Polish biochemist Casimir Funk developed the concept of vitamins. One of these was thought to be the anti-scorbutic factor. In 1928, this was referred to as "water-soluble C", although its chemical structure had not been determined.

From 1928 to 1932, Albert Szent-Györgyi and Joseph L. Svirbely's Hungarian team, and Charles Glen King's American team, identified the anti-scorbutic factor. Szent-Györgyi isolated hexuronic acid from animal adrenal glands, and suspected it to be the antiscorbutic factor. In late 1931, Szent-Györgyi gave Svirbely the last of his adrenal-derived hexuronic acid with the suggestion that it might be the anti-scorbutic factor. By the spring of 1932, King's laboratory had proven this, but published the result without giving Szent-Györgyi credit for it. This led to a bitter dispute over priority. In 1933, Walter Norman Haworth chemically identified the vitamin as -hexuronic acid, proving this by synthesis in 1933. Haworth and Szent-Györgyi proposed that L-hexuronic acid be named a-scorbic acid, and chemically -ascorbic acid, in honor of its activity against scurvy. The term's etymology is from Latin, "a-" meaning away, or off from, while -scorbic is from Medieval Latin scorbuticus (pertaining to scurvy), cognate with Old Norse skyrbjugr, French scorbut, Dutch scheurbuik and Low German scharbock. Partly for this discovery, Szent-Györgyi was awarded the 1937 Nobel Prize in Medicine, and Haworth shared that year's Nobel Prize in Chemistry.

In 1957, J. J. Burns showed that some mammals are susceptible to scurvy as their liver does not produce the enzyme -gulonolactone oxidase, the last of the chain of four enzymes that synthesize vitamin C. American biochemist Irwin Stone was the first to exploit vitamin C for its food preservative properties. He later developed the idea that humans possess a mutated form of the -gulonolactone oxidase coding gene.

In 2008, researchers at the University of Montpellier discovered that in humans and other primates the red blood cells have evolved a mechanism to more efficiently utilize the vitamin C present in the body by recycling oxidized -dehydroascorbic acid (DHA) back into ascorbic acid for reuse by the body. The mechanism was not found to be present in mammals that synthesize their own vitamin C.

Large doses

Vitamin C megadosage is a term describing the consumption or injection of vitamin C in doses comparable to or higher than the amounts produced by the livers of mammals which are able to synthesize vitamin C. An argument for this, although not the actual term, was described in 1970 in an article by Linus Pauling. Briefly, his position was that for optimal health, humans should be consuming at least 2,300 mg/day to compensate for the inability to synthesize vitamin C. The recommendation also fell into the consumption range for gorillas - a non-synthesizing near-relative to humans. A second argument for high intake is that serum ascorbic acid concentrations increase as intake increases until it plateaus at about 190 to 200 micromoles per liter (µmol/L) once consumption exceeds 1,250 milligrams. As noted, government recommendations are a range of 40 to 110 mg/day and normal plasma is approximately 50 µmol/L, so 'normal' is about 25% of what can be achieved when oral consumption is in the proposed megadose range.

Pauling popularized the concept of high dose vitamin C as prevention and treatment of the common cold in 1970. A few years later he proposed that vitamin C would prevent cardiovascular disease, and that 10 grams/day, initially (10 days) administered intravenously and thereafter orally, would cure late-stage cancer. Mega-dosing with ascorbic acid has other champions, among them chemist Irwin Stone and the controversial Matthias Rath and Patrick Holford, who both have been accused of making unsubstantiated treatment claims for treating cancer and HIV infection.

Vitamin C mega-dosages are to a large degree discredited. There is no scientific evidence that vitamin C megadosage helps to cure or prevent cancer, the common cold, or some other medical conditions. Benefits are not superior when supplement intakes of more than 1,000 mg/day are compared to intakes between 200 and 1,000 mg/day, and so not limited to the mega-dose range. The idea that large amounts of intravenous ascorbic acid can be used to treat late-stage cancer is - some forty years after Pauling's seminal paper - still considered unproven and still in need of high quality research. However, a lack of evidence has not stopped individual physicians from prescribing intravenous ascorbic acid to thousands of people with cancer.

Society and culture 
In February 2011, the Swiss Post issued a postage stamp bearing a depiction of a model of a molecule of vitamin C to mark the International Year of Chemistry.

Brand names 
Vitamin C is sold around the world as a stand-alone product at amounts up to 1,000 mg and as part of fixed-dose combination products, under many brand names.

Pharmacopoeias
 British Pharmacopoeia
 Japanese Pharmacopoeia

Notes

References

Further reading

External links 

 
 

 
3-Hydroxypropenals
Biomolecules
Coenzymes
Dietary antioxidants
Dihydrofurans
E-number additives
Enediols
Food antioxidants
Furanones
Organic acids
Orthomolecular medicine
World Health Organization essential medicines
Wikipedia medicine articles ready to translate
Ophthalmology drugs